Stephanie Shwabsky was the Australian Ambassador to Lebanon from 2002 until 2006 and to Egypt from 2008 to 2012.

Shwabsky is an honors graduate of the University of Sydney.

References

Ambassadors of Australia to Egypt
Ambassadors of Australia to Tunisia
Ambassadors of Australia to Lebanon
University of Sydney alumni
Year of birth missing (living people)
Living people
Australian women ambassadors